Basy is a rural locality (a selo) and the administrative center of Basinsky Selsoviet, Limansky District, Astrakhan Oblast, Russia. The population was 997 as of 2010. There are 19 streets.

Demographics

Ethnic composition 

As of 2002, ethnic Russians and Chechens were the two largest groups in the village.

Geography 
Basy is located 45 km north of Liman (the district's administrative centre) by road. Basinsk is the nearest rural locality.

References 

Rural localities in Limansky District